The tenth series of The Bill, a British television drama, consisted of 156 episodes, broadcast between 4 January and 30 December 1994. On 3 October 2012, The Bill Series 10 Part 1 & 2 and The Bill Series 10 Part 3 & 4 DVD sets were released (in Australia).

Audio Commentaries have been recorded for the episodes "Bin-Men", "Blackout", "Instant Response" and "Taken on Trust", released exclusively on The Bill Podcast Patreon channel.

Cast changes

Arrivals
 DI Sally Johnson (Episode 2-)
 DC Rod Skase (Episode 4-)
 PC Adam Bostock (Episode 7-Episode 106)
 DS Chris Deakin (Episode 91-)

Departures
 PC Adam Bostock - Unexplained
 DS Jo Morgan - Transferred to the Regional Crime Squad (returned in 1995)

Episodes

1994 British television seasons
The Bill series